Wilson Piedmont Glacier is a large piedmont glacier extending from Granite Harbour to Marble Point on the coast of Victoria Land. Scheuren Stream takes meltwater from the glacier into the Bay of Sails, while South Stream flows southeastward to Bernacchi Bay.
Discovered by the Discovery expedition, 1901–04. The British Antarctic Expedition, 1910–13, named the feature for Dr. Edward A. Wilson, surgeon and artist with Scott's first expedition and chief of the scientific staff with the second. Wilson lost his life on the way back from the South Pole with Scott.

See also
Ball Stream
King Pin

Glaciers of Scott Coast